Kristin Tøsse Løvseth (born 6 April 1973 in Lillehammer) is a Norwegian curler. 

At he international level, she competed as a member of Norway women's team on 1998 Winter Olympics (they finished on fifth place), on eight  (best result - silver medals in ) and seven  (best result - silver medals in ).

References

External links
 
 

Living people
1973 births
Sportspeople from Lillehammer
Norwegian female curlers
Curlers at the 1998 Winter Olympics